David Rocco (born July 27, 1970) is a Canadian author, cook, and host of several internationally syndicated television series. He is most known for producing and hosting the television series David Rocco's Dolce Vita, and publishing four cookbooks Avventura, David Rocco's Dolce Vita, Made in Italy, and David Rocco's Dolce Famiglia.

Early life
David Rocco was born in Scarborough, Ontario, Canada (later part of Toronto) to parents who immigrated to Canada from Naples, Italy in the 1950s. His parents were both hairdressers, and Rocco is the youngest of three children. Rocco later moved with his family to Woodbridge, Ontario, where, in high school, he met his future wife Nina Rocco. The couple has three children: Emma, Giorgia, and Dante.
 
Named one of "Canada's Top Ten Style Makers" by Flare Magazine, Rocco has been featured and is often quoted in major newspapers and magazines, including The Globe and Mail, The National Post, The Toronto Star, Hello!, En Route, Food & Drink, and Chatelaine. He also makes regular guest appearances on Global, CTV and CBC television as well as popular food competition programs including Top Chef Canada and Iron Chef America.

David Rocco's Dolce Vita
Four seasons of David Rocco's Dolce Vita launched worldwide, first in 2004, including Food Network Canada, Telelatino, BBC Food, Discovery Travel, Nat Geo Adventure Channel, India's Fox Life, and in the U.S. on the Cooking Channel. In Dolce Vita, Rocco explores Italy with his wife Nina and his eclectic group of friends while teaching about the simplicity of Italian cuisine and culture, and showcasing the city life and countryside.
 
Several spin-offs of the show followed. Two seasons of David Rocco's Dolce India launched worldwide, first in 2013, through National Geographic. In 26 episodes, Rocco explores the remarkable diversity of Indian cuisine and fuses it with his Italian foundations. Each episode presents an Indian theme; an ingredient, a dish, or a regional way of cooking.  Having been shown how to prepare a challenging dish, Rocco then takes over a kitchen to prepare an "Indi-talian" fusion dish.

Other spin-offs include David Rocco's Dolce Napoli, David Rocco's Dolce Africa, and David Rocco's Dolce Italia.

Other TV appearances
Rocco was the lead judge of the popular Scripps Television series Donut Showdown which premiered in 2013 on Food Network Canada on the Cooking Channel in the USA. Rocco can be seen as a guest judge on Top Chef Canada Season 3. Rocco has made regular appearances as a guest judge on Iron Chef in seasons 9–11.
 
He was also the co-creator and host of Catalyst Entertainment's food and travel hybrid series Avventura: Journey in Italian Cuisine, and was a featured host for Don't Forget Your Passport.

In 2018, Rocco and Hong Kong singer Nicholas Tse co-hosted FOX Life's Celebrity Chef: East vs West.

Cook books
Rocco has published four cookbooks, including two national best sellers: David Rocco’s Dolce Vita and Made In Italy, each receiving numerous awards and accolades including top honors from The Gourmand World Cookbook Awards and Taste Canada. His newest book, Dolce Famiglia, was released in Canada and Worldwide in November 2016.

Dolce Famiglia (HarperCollins; November 2016)
Made In Italy (Clarkson Potter, HarperCollins; October 2011)
David Rocco's Dolce Vita (HarperCollins; November 2008)
Avventura (Bay Books; January 2001)

Other ventures

As well as his cooking projects, Rocco has ventured out into the world of winemaking by launching his own wine label, David Rocco's Dolce Vita, featuring three varieties: Prosecco, Chianti, and Pinot Grigio.

References

External links 
 
David Rocco on Cooking Channel
David Rocco's Dolce Vita on Food TV Canada

1970 births
Living people
21st-century Canadian male actors
Canadian cookbook writers
Canadian male chefs
Canadian male television actors
Canadian people of Italian descent
Canadian television chefs
Canadian television hosts
Chefs of Italian cuisine
Chefs from Toronto
Male actors from Toronto
Writers from Scarborough, Toronto